Events from the year 2002 in Brazil

Incumbents

Federal government
 President: Fernando Henrique Cardoso
 Vice President: Marco Maciel

Governors
 Acre: Jorge Viana 
 Alagoas: Ronaldo Lessa 
 Amapa: 
 till 1 April: João Capiberibe
 1 April-31 December: Dalva de Souza Figueiredo
 Amazonas: Amazonino Mendes
 Bahia: César Borges (till 5 April); Otto Alencar (from 5 April)
 Ceará: Tasso Jereissati (till 5 April); Beni Veras (from 5 April)
 Espírito Santo: José Ignácio Ferreira 
 Goiás: Marconi Perillo 
 Maranhão: Roseana Sarney (till 5 April); José Reinaldo Tavares (from 5 April)
 Mato Grosso: Dante de Oliveira then Rogério Salles
 Mato Grosso do Sul: José Orcírio Miranda dos Santos
 Minas Gerais: Itamar Franco 
 Pará: Almir Gabriel 
 Paraíba: José Maranhão (till 6 April); Roberto Paulino (6 April-31 December)
 Paraná: Jaime Lerner 
 Pernambuco: Jarbas Vasconcelos 
 Piauí: Hugo Napoleão 
 Rio de Janeiro: Anthony Garotinho then Benedita da Silva
 Rio Grande do Norte: Garibaldi Alves Filho (till 6 April); Fernando Antonio Chamber Freire (from 6 April)
 Rio Grande do Sul: Olívio Dutra 
 Rondônia: José de Abreu Bianco 
 Roraima: Neudo Ribeiro Campos (till 6 April); Francisco Flamarion Portela (from 6 April)
 Santa Catarina: Esperidião Amin (till 1 January); Luiz Henrique da Silveira (from 1 January)
 São Paulo: Geraldo Alckmin 
 Sergipe: Albano Franco 
 Tocantins: José Wilson Siqueira Campos

Vice governors
 Acre: Edison Simão Cadaxo 
 Alagoas: Geraldo Costa Sampaio 
 Amapá: Maria Dalva de Souza Figueiredo (till 5 April); vacant thereafter (from 5 April)
 Amazonas: Samuel Assayag Hanan 
 Bahia: Otto Alencar (till 6 April), vacant thereafter (from 6 April)
 Ceará: Benedito Clayton Veras Alcântara (till 6 April); vacant thereafter (from 6 April)
 Espírito Santo: Celso José Vasconcelos 
 Goiás: Alcides Rodrigues Filho 
 Maranhão: José Reinaldo Carneiro Tavares (till 5 April), vacant thereafter (from 5 April)
 Mato Grosso: José Rogério Sales (till 5 April); vacant thereafter (from 5 April)
 Mato Grosso do Sul: Moacir Kohl 
 Minas Gerais: Newton Cardoso 
 Pará: Hildegardo de Figueiredo Nunes 
 Paraíba: Antônio Roberto de Sousa Paulino (till 5 April); vacant thereafter (from 5 April)
 Paraná: Emília de Sales Belinati 
 Pernambuco: José Mendonça Bezerra Filho 
 Piauí: Felipe Mendes de Oliveira 
 Rio de Janeiro: Benedita da Silva (till 6 April); vacant thereafter (from 5 April)
 Rio Grande do Norte: Fernando Freire (till 5 April); vacant thereafter (from 5 April)
 Rio Grande do Sul: Miguel Soldatelli Rossetto 
 Rondônia: Miguel de Souza 
 Roraima: Francisco Flamarion Portela (until 5 April); vacant thereafter (from 5 April)
 Santa Catarina: Paulo Roberto Bauer
 São Paulo: vacant 
 Sergipe: Benedito de Figueiredo
 Tocantins: João Lisboa da Cruz

Events
October 6 – In the first round of the Brazilian general election, 2002,  Workers' Party leader Luiz Inácio Lula da Silva fails to obtain a majority of the valid votes cast.
October 27 – In the second round of the presidential election, Lula da Silva wins 52.7 million votes (61.3% of the total).

Culture

Films
See List of Brazilian films of 2002

Music
Romero Lubambo - Brazilian Routes

Births

March 10 – Júlia Gomes, actress and singer
April 8 – Isabella Nardoni, murder victim (died 2008)
May 3 – MC Pedrinho, singer 
May 22 – Maisa Silva, singer, TV hostess and actress
July 13 – Deborah Medrado, rhythmic gymnast
July 24 – Nicole Pircio, rhythmic gymnast
December 17 – Guilherme Seta, actor

Deaths
January 18 – Celso Daniel, Brazilian politician (born 1951)
May 16 – José Reis, scientist
June 2 – Tim Lopes, journalist, 51 (murdered by drug traffickers)
November 27 - Helber Rangel, film actor

See also
2002 in Brazilian football
2002 in Brazilian television
List of Brazilian films of 2002

References

 
Years of the 21st century in Brazil
Brazil
2000s in Brazil
Brazil